The Bridge Studios is a Canadian film studio in Burnaby, British Columbia. It operates the largest effects stage in North America.

The studios' name derives from the lot's use by Dominion Bridge Company, a steel bridge constructor, from 1930 until the mid-1970s.

The site was first used for filming after the departure of Dominion Bridge. The government of British Columbia financed the conversion of the lot to permanent studios in 1987.

Shows filmed at the Studios
The parenthetical years are filming dates, not release dates.

Once Upon a Time (2010–2018) 
3000 Miles to Graceland (1999)
40 Days and 40 Nights (2000)
Alive: The Miracle of the Andes (1991)
Another Stakeout (1992)
Bad Company (1993)
Battlestar Galactica (2003)
Big Bully (1996)
Bird on a Wire (1989)
Black Christmas (2006)
Blade: Trinity (2004)
Boy Meets Girl (1993)
The Boy Who Could Fly (1985)
Breaking News (2000-2001)
Carpool (1996)
Carrie (2002)
Christmas Comes to Willow Creek (1988)
The Clan of the Cave Bear (1984)
Cousins (1989)
Creature (1996)
The Crush (1992)
Dead Like Me (2003)
The Death of the Incredible Hulk (1989)
Deep Rising (1997)
Defying Gravity (2009)
Devour (2004)
Disappearance of Vonnie (1993)
Double Happiness (1992)
Dudley Do-Right (1999)
Dungeon Siege (2005)
Ecks vs. Sever (2002)
The Escape (1998)
The Experts (1988)
First Blood (1982)
The Five People You Meet in Heaven (2004)
The Fly II (1988)
Glory Days (2002)
Hidden Target (2001)
Highlander: The Series (1992)
Highstakes (1985)
Hollow Man 2 (2005)
Iceman (1984)
The Imaginarium of Doctor Parnassus (2007)
It (1990)
J.J. Starbuck (1988)
Jeremiah (2001-2003)
John Tucker Must Die (2006)
Jumanji (1995)
Kevin of the North (2000)
Killer Instinct (2005)
Kyle/Just a Phase (2005)
Leaving Normal (1991)
Legends of the Fall (1993)
Look Who's Talking Now (1992)
MacGyver (1987-1991)
Man of the House (1994)
Martian Child (2007)
Miracle (2004)
Miracle on I-880 (1992)
Miracle on Ice (2003)
Mission to Mars (2000)
Mother Lode (1981)
Mustard Pancakes (2004)
My Brother's Keeper (2001)
Narrow Margin (1990)
The New Adventures of Beans Baxter (1988)
Outer Limits (1993-2001)
Passing Through Veils (1991)
PC and the Web (1999)
The Pledge (1999)
Poltergeist (1994-1998)
Reign of Fire (2001)
Roxanne (1986)
Runaway (1984)
Saints (1988)
Scary Movie 3 (2003)
Shoot to Kill (1988)
Snow Dogs (2001)
Snow Falling on Cedars (1996)
Spacehunter: Adventures in the Forbidden Zone (1983)
Sphere (1996)
Stakeout (1987)
Stargate Atlantis (2004-2009)
Stargate SG-1 (1997-2007)
Stargate Universe (2009-2011)
Stay Tuned (1992)
Sudbury (2004)
They (2001)
Thir13en Ghosts (2001)
Timecop (1994)
Tomb of Charles D Ward (1991)
Tooth Fairy (2005)
Trapped (2001)
Trial of the Hulk (1989)
Two for the Money (2004)
Valentine (2000)
Walls (1984)
White Fang (1991)
Wolf Lake (2000)
A Wrinkle in Time (2001)
Wrong Turn 2: Dead End (2007)

External links 
 

Buildings and structures in Burnaby
Canadian film studios
Cinema of British Columbia
Film production companies of Canada